The Nappstraum Tunnel is an undersea road tunnel in Nordland county, Norway. The village of Napp lies just south of the west entrance to the tunnel. The tunnel opened on 11 July 1990 to replace an old ferry connection that ran between the two islands. The tunnel had a toll on it until 2003 when the debt for the tunnel was paid off.

References

Flakstad
Road tunnels in Nordland